Marinobacter aromaticivorans is a Gram-negative, rod-shaped and slightly halotolerant bacterium from the genus of Marinobacter which has been isolated from sediments from the South China Sea. Marinobacter aromaticivorans has the ability to degrade polycyclic aromatic hydrocarbons.

References

External links
Type strain of Marinobacter aromaticivorans at BacDive -  the Bacterial Diversity Metadatabase

Further reading 
 

Alteromonadales
Bacteria described in 2016